The Unearthly is a 1957 independently made American black-and-white science fiction horror film, produced and directed by Boris Petroff (as Brook L. Peters). It stars John Carradine, Myron Healey, Allison Hayes, Marilyn Buferd, Arthur Batanides, Sally Todd, and Tor Johnson. The film was written by Jane Mann and John D.F. Black.

Plot
At his psychiatric institute, Dr. Charles Conway (John Carradine) is surreptitiously experimenting with artificial glands to try to create longevity; he works with his minion Lobo (Tor Johnson) and his assistant Dr. Sharon Gilchrist (Marilyn Buferd). Conway receives his test subjects through an associate, Dr. Loren Wright (Roy Gordon), who delivers patients seeking treatment for lesser conditions. After this, they are then taken into the operating room for Conway's illicit surgery.

Wright delivers his newest find, Grace Thomas (Allison Hayes), who is seeking treatment for depression. When Conway balks at Wright for bringing him a patient with living relatives, he confides in Conway that he plans to throw Grace's purse and bags into the bay, to fool family and the authorities into believing she had committed suicide. He then asks Conway for a demonstration of his experimental progress; Conway takes him down into the basement, where he introduces him to Harry Jedrow (Harry Fleer), his latest victim. Jedrow is clearly alive, but severely disfigured and in a vegetative state; this concerns Wright, who reveals that Jedrow's sister is currently seeking him out. Conway is furious, since none of his patients were supposed to have ties of any kind.

That night, Lobo (who famously delivers the line "Time for go to bed!") discovers Frank Scott (Myron Healey) roaming around the grounds. Scott attempts to conceal his identity, but Conway quickly deduces that he is an escaped convict from his description in the newspapers, as well as a telltale tattoo on his wrist. Rather than turn Scott into the police, he offers him the chance to take part in his experiments. Knowing the odds are stacked against him, Scott accepts his offer.

Scott is introduced to Grace the following morning, along with the two other patients: Danny Green (Arthur Batanides), who is being treated for anger issues, and pretty young Natalie Andries (Sally Todd), whose treatment schedule for a nervous breakdown is nearing completion. After demanding Wright to make out a certificate of death for Harry Jedrow, Conway happily informs Natalie that one last treatment for her is all that's necessary. While the other patients sleep, Natalie is sedated, taken to the operating room, and given an artificial gland along with a high dosage of electricity. The procedure backfires, and she ends up a senile old woman. They hide her in a back room.

Lobo is ordered to bury Jedrow alive, but Frank Scott sneaks out to the burial site and opens the coffin. Jedrow rises out of it and escapes, and Lobo - not having been alerted - buries the casket. Sharon confronts Conway about his apparent affinity for Grace, and requests that she be made the next patient to be experimented upon. Meanwhile, Scott begins attempting to reveal to the other patients that Dr. Conway is carrying out horrific deeds to their friends. After a failed attempt to reveal Natalie's fate, he manages to show Grace and Danny what had happened to her, only to get caught by Dr. Conway and Sharon. They detain Scott and Danny and prepare Grace for surgery.

Danny helps Scott escape by distracting Lobo, who fatally shoots him before being knocked unconscious. Scott confronts Dr. Conway with Lobo's gun and reveals that he is not a convicted murderer; he is actually Lt. Mark Houston, an undercover police officer sent to the psychiatrist's business to investigate it. Dr. Conway evades arrest, but is murdered by Jedrow. Lobo comes in and kills Jedrow, but Chambers' police backup arrive soon afterward and arrest Lobo and Sharon, barely saving Grace from the procedure. The police go downstairs and find Danny's body, and then discover a menagerie of beastly men, all failed subjects of Conway's longevity experiments. The police captain wonders, "Good Lord - what if they DO live forever?"

Cast
 John Carradine as Dr. Charles Conway
 Myron Healey (misspelled Myron Healy) as Mark Houston, alias Frank Scott
 Allison Hayes as Grace Thomas
 Marilyn Buferd (misspelled Marylyn Buferd) as Dr. Sharon Gilchrist
 Arthur Batanides as Danny Green
 Sally Todd as Natalie Andries
 Tor Johnson as Lobo
 Harry Fleer as Harry Jedrow
 Roy Gordon as Dr. Loren Wright
 Guy Prescott as Police Captain George Reagan
 Raymond Guth (misspelled Raymond Guta) as Police Officer Miller
 Paul McWillimas as Police Officer Ed

Production
Along with Anatomy of a Psycho (1961), The Unearthly was one of two films produced and directed by Boris Petroff as "Brook L. Peters." Originally called The House of Monsters, it was filmed over approximately five days. The film was acquired by American Broadcasting-Paramount Theatres Pictures after principal photography had been completed. While the film credits Jane Mann with the original story, her co-screenwriter John D.F. Black (credited as Geoffrey Dennis) reports that she merely typed the script. Tor Johnson appears as Dr. Conway's minion "Lobo", a role similar to his character of the same name in Ed Wood's Bride of the Monster (1955). Johnson also played Lobo in Night of the Ghouls, a pseudo-sequel to Bride; it was shot in 1957 and released nearly thirty years later.

Of note, the production designer was Charles D. Hall, credited here as Daniel Hall. This was his second to last feature. Hall was the acclaimed art director of Dracula (1931), Frankenstein (1931), Murders in the Rue Morgue (1932), The Invisible Man (1933), The Black Cat (1934), Bride of Frankenstein (1935), and One Million B.C. (1940). In many of his later productions, Hall used found objects and locations. These were both simple and economical. Here he uses found props in addition to simple designs for the operating room and the creature holding cell, where the monsters toil at a turret, reminiscent of Island of Lost Souls (1932), intended as a brief tribute to the horror genre greats. Character actor Richard Reeves appears here, uncredited, as one of the toiling creatures.

The film’s score was written by Henry Vars (1902-1972).

Release

Theatrical
Released in the United-States on 28 June 1957, The Unearthly was distributed theatrically by Republic Pictures Corp. on a double feature with Beginning of the End (1957). It continued to be shown in theaters until at least 1962.

Home media
The film aired on television as early as 25 March 1962, and eventually received multiple releases on VHS. It was released on DVD on 6 August 2002 by Image Entertainment. The DVD of the Mystery Science Theater 3000 episode featuring The Unearthly (originally aired 14 December 1991) was released by Shout! Factory on 16 November 2011.

Reception
The film was reviewed negatively in the film trade journal Harrison's Reports, being described as "mediocre", "produced on a shoe-string budget", and "a feeble and trite effort, full of obvious theatrics and hammy melodramatic acting."

Film critic Leonard Maltin later gave the film one and a half out of four stars, commenting "Mad scientist Carradine's experiments in immortality have resulted only in a basement full of deformed morons. Don't you join them."

See also
 List of American films of 1957

References

External links
 : 
 

1957 films
1950s science fiction horror films
American science fiction horror films
American black-and-white films
Films set in psychiatric hospitals
Mad scientist films
Republic Pictures films
1950s English-language films
1950s American films